The 2015 Conference USA women's basketball tournament was a postseason women's basketball tournament for Conference USA was held March 11–14 in Birmingham, Alabama. The first two rounds will take place at Bartow Arena while the semifinals and championship will take place at Birmingham–Jefferson Convention Complex.

Seeds
The top twelve teams qualified for the tournament. Teams were seeded by record within the conference, with a tiebreaker system to seed teams with identical conference records.

Eliminated from Conference tournament: North Texas (4-14), FIU (0-18)

Schedule

Bracket

All times listed are Central

See also
2015 Conference USA men's basketball tournament

References

Conference USA women's basketball tournament
Conference USA women's basketball tournament
Tournament
Conference USA women's basketball tournament